Di Derre is a Norwegian Pop rock band, founded in 1992.  They were awarded the Gammleng-prisen in 1996.

Band members
Jo Nesbø – vocals, guitar
Espen Stenhammer – drums
Magnus Larsen jr. – bass guitar, vocals
Halvor Holter – keyboards
Unni Wilhelmsen – vocals, guitar (joined September 2013)

Former members
Knut Nesbø – vocals, guitar (died in 2013)
Sverre Beyer – drummer (died 2002)

Discography

References

External links
Article about the band in the Norwegian music magazine MIC 
"Sprettent band klar for fest" 
"Unni Wilhelmsen ny gitarist i Di Derre" 

Musical groups established in 1992
Norwegian musical groups
Vitamin Records artists